Seyed Reza Talabeh Yazdi (born March 8, 1989, in Yazd) is an Iranian football defender who currently plays for Malavan F.C. in the Iran Pro League.

Club Career Statistic

Last Update: 1 August 2011 

 Assist Goals

References

1989 births
Living people
Iranian footballers
Association football defenders
Sepahan S.C. footballers
Sepahan Novin players
Malavan players
People from Yazd
Footballers at the 2010 Asian Games
Sportspeople from Yazd
Asian Games competitors for Iran
21st-century Iranian people